Joseph Chalmers may refer to:

Joseph W. Chalmers (1806–1853), American senator
Joe Chalmers (born 1994), Scottish footballer (Celtic FC)